Jai Baba is a 2001 compilation album by Pete Townshend dedicated to Meher Baba. The album features music from three Meher Baba tribute albums featuring Townshend in the 1970s, Happy Birthday, I Am, and With Love.

References

2001 albums
Pete Townshend albums
Albums produced by Pete Townshend